The Microcassette (often written generically as microcassette) is an audio storage medium, introduced by Olympus in 1969. 

It has the same width of magnetic tape as the Compact Cassette but in a cassette roughly one quarter the size. By using thinner tape and half or a quarter the tape speed, microcassettes can offer comparable recording time to the compact cassette but in a smaller package.

History
 

Microcassettes have mostly been used for recording voice. In particular, they are commonly used in dictation machines and answering machines. Microcassettes have also been used in computer data storage and to record music. For the latter purpose, devices for recording in stereo were produced in 1982 and, for higher fidelity, microcassettes using Type IV ("metal", i.e. coated with pure metal particles rather than oxide) tape were sold. This was an attempt by Olympus to cash in on the burgeoning Walkman market; one model, the Olympus SR-11, had a built-in radio and offered a stereo tie-clip microphone as an accessory, which made the unit somewhat popular with concert-goers who wanted to record the concerts they attended without drawing attention to themselves with larger, bulkier full-sized cassette recorders. 

Both of these "high-fidelity" microcassette recorders and the special Type IV blanks they required were relatively expensive and of limited availability, so the system was not widely adopted and Olympus phased them out after two years on the market.  (Battery life also was a problem, because the high bias currents required by Type IV tape, combined with the state of battery technology at the time, meant that brand-new alkaline batteries might give out in two hours when the unit was in recording mode.) "Standard" microcassettes are still used in the underground-music circuits for recording and distributing experimental music and field recordings/sound collage, mostly because of their lo-fi qualities. As of August 2021, Ohm Electric still produces microcassette tapes.

Specifications
The original standard microcassette, the MC60, gives 30 minutes recording per side at its standard speed of 2.4 cm/s, and double that duration at 1.2 cm/s; an MC90, giving 45 minutes per side @ 2.4 cm/s, is also available from a few manufacturers. Unlike the Compact Cassette, a choice of recording speeds was provided on the original recorders and many others; the tape also spools in the opposite direction, from right to left. For transcription purposes, continuously variable speed was provided on many players. Microcassettes equalisation time constant: Type I (Ferric) at 200μs and Type IV (Metal) at 120μs.

Competitors

The microcassette was beaten to market by the mini-cassette, introduced by Philips in 1967. The mini-cassette is almost identical in appearance and dimensions to the microcassette, however it has thicker cogs for its reels and a slightly wider cassette. The mini-cassette, despite making it to market first, was less successful than the microcassette. 

A couple of products were created to compete with the microcassette. Dictaphone and JVC introduced the picocassette in 1985, which is half the size of the microcassette. In 1992, Sony released the NT memo recording system, which employs a small cassette for digital recording.

See also
 inches per second and audio tape length and thickness for comparisons with other media.
 Mini-Cassette
 Picocassette
 NT (cassette)

Notes

External links and references

Olympus History (includes reference to first microcassette recorder)
Tech Flashback: The Microcasette – Part 1: The Tapes - Gough's Tech Zone
Tech Flashback: The Microcasette – Part 2: The Recorders - Gough's Tech Zone

Audiovisual introductions in 1969
Audio storage
Tape recording
1969 in music
1969 in technology
Products introduced in 1969